Sparta Rotterdam is a Dutch professional football club based in Rotterdam. Established on 1 April 1888, Sparta Rotterdam is the oldest professional football team in the Netherlands.

Sparta currently compete in the Eredivisie, the top flight of Dutch professional football, which they have won 6 times, having earned promotion from the Eerste Divisie in 2018–19. The club is one of three professional football clubs from Rotterdam, the others being Excelsior (est. 1902) and Feyenoord (est. 1908).

History

On 1 April 1888, several students from Rotterdam founded a cricket club called Rotterdamsche Cricket & Football Club Sparta. In July 1888, a football branch of the club was established. In 1890, Sparta played its first real football match, and in 1892 Sparta disbanded the cricket branch. Sparta was promoted to the highest league of Dutch football on 23 April 1893. In 1897, Sparta withdrew from the competition after continuous dubious arbitration of Sparta matches. The club continued to exist, however, and in 1899 the board of Sparta visited a match of Sunderland. Impressed with the red-and-white jersey of the English club, the board decided that Sunderland's colours (red-white striped jersey, black shorts) would henceforth be the colours of Sparta.

In 1905, Sparta initiated and organised the first home match of the Netherlands national team, against Belgium. The match, won 4–0 by the Netherlands, was a rematch of a game two weeks prior, when the Netherlands beat Belgium 4–1 in Antwerp, Belgium.

The first match at Sparta's new stadium, Het Kasteel (The Castle), in the Spangen area of west Rotterdam, was played on 14 October 1916. The stadium was renovated in 1999 and is still Sparta's stadium.

Until the 2002–03 season, Sparta had always played at the highest level, but after they appointed the former international player Frank Rijkaard as a manager they were relegated from the top-level Eredivisie in 2002. That made Rijkaard resign from his position. Sparta returned to the Eredivisie for the 2005–06 season. They were relegated again in 2010. On 20 August 2010, they equalled Ajax's and Heracles Almelo's Dutch league record win when they defeated Almere City 12–1 with Johan Voskamp scoring an Eerste Divisie record 8 goals on his debut.

After six years in the Eerste Divisie, Sparta again won promotion to the Eredivisie in April 2016 after a 3–1 win over Jong Ajax won them an unassailable lead over second placed VVV-Venlo. However, they were relegated for the third time in their history in May 2018 after they were beaten 1–3 on aggregate by FC Emmen in the promotion/relegation play-offs. The result proved to be a historical one since Emmen won their first ever promotion to the Eredivisie.

Sparta has won six national titles (1909, 1911, 1912, 1913, 1915 and 1959) and three national cups (1958, 1962 and 1966).

Meuse/Scheldt Cup
The best footballers of Rotterdam and Antwerp contested a yearly match between 1909 and 1959 for the Meuse- and Scheldt Cup (Maas- en Schelde Beker). It was agreed to play the game at stadium Het Kasteel in Rotterdam and at the Bosuilstadion in Antwerp. The cup was provided in 1909 by Kees van Hasselt from Rotterdam and P. Havenith from Antwerp.

Youth program

The Sparta Jeugdopleiding (English: Sparta Youth Academy) is a four-star certified youth academy and amongst the strongest in the nation, having won the national academy of the year award on several occasions. Several International footballers have progressed through the ranks of the academy, including Danny Blind, Danny Koevermans, David Mendes da Silva, Ed de Goey, Winston Bogarde, Memphis Depay, Henk Fräser, Jan van Beveren, Georginio Wijnaldum, Anwar El Ghazi, Jetro Willems, John de Wolf, Kevin Strootman, Rick van Drongelen and Nick Viergever, Marten de Roon amongst others.

Honours

National
Netherlands Football League Championship / Eredivisie: 6
 1908–09, 1910–11, 1911–12, 1912–13, 1914–15, 1958–59

Eerste Divisie: 1
 2015–16

KNVB Cup: 3
 1957–58, 1961–62, 1965–66

Others
Rotterdam Easter Tournament 
Runners-up (2): 1934, 1948

Domestic results

Below is a table with Sparta Rotterdam's domestic results since the introduction of the Eredivisie in 1956.

Sparta in Europe

 Q = Qualifying Round
 1R = First round
 2R = Second round
 3R = Third round
 1/4 = Quarter-final

Current squad

Reserve squad

Players out on loan

Former players

Club staff

Former coaches

Edgar Chadwick (1915)
Peter Donaghy (1929–30)
Doug Livingstone (1949)
Walter Crook (1950)
Denis Neville (1955–63)
Bill Thompson (1963–66)
Wiel Coerver (1966–69)
Georg Keßler (1970–71)
Elek Schwartz (1971–72)
Jimmy Adamson (1976)
Cor Brom (1976–78)
Mircea Petescu (1978–80)
Joop Brand (1980)
Barry Hughes (1980–83)
Bert Jacobs (1983–84)
Theo Vonk (1984–86)
Barry Hughes (1986–88)
Rob Baan (1988–90)
Rob Jacobs (1991–93)
Han Berger (1993–95)
Henk van Stee (1995)
Henk ten Cate (1995–97)
Hans van der Zee (1997–98)
Jan Everse (1998–99)
Dolf Roks (1999–01)
Willem van Hanegem (2001)
Frank Rijkaard (2001–02)
Fritz Korbach (2003)
Chris Dekker (2003)
Mike Snoei (2003–05)
Adri van Tiggelen (interim) (2005)
Wiljan Vloet (2005–07)
Gert Aandewiel (2007)
Adri van Tiggelen (interim) (2007)
Foeke Booy (2007–09)
Frans Adelaar (2009–10)
Aad de Mos (2010)
Jan Everse (2010–11)
Jos van Eck (2011)
Michel Vonk (2011–13)
Henk ten Cate (interim) (2013)
Gert Kruys (2014)
Alex Pastoor (2015–2017)
Dolf Roks (interim) (2017)
Dick Advocaat (2018)
Henk Fraser (2018–2022)
Maurice Steijn (2022–present)

See also
Sparta Rotterdam season 2001–02
Sparta Rotterdam season 2002–03
Sparta Rotterdam season 2003–04

References

External links

Official website 
Sparta Rotterdam at Football-lineups.com
Statistics
itwm
despartasupporter
Unofficial website 

 
Football clubs in Rotterdam
Football clubs in the Netherlands
1888 establishments in the Netherlands
Association football clubs established in 1888